Florian Lobeck (born 16 January 1816 in Profen, Landkreis Zeitz, Province of Saxony; d. 18 August 1869 in Santiago de Chile) was a German naturalist.

Biography
He was long a resident in Chile, where he had made large contributions to natural science, and was for several years professor of natural history in the University of Santiago.

References

1816 births
1869 deaths
German naturalists
Academic staff of the University of Chile